Ted Wheeler (January 30, 1931 – November 17, 2022) was an American middle-distance runner. He competed in the men's 1500 metres at the 1956 Summer Olympics.

References

External links
 

1931 births
2022 deaths
Athletes (track and field) at the 1956 Summer Olympics
American male middle-distance runners
Olympic track and field athletes of the United States
Sportspeople from Chattanooga, Tennessee